Eugene Ivanov (19 January 1966 in Tyumen, Siberia, Russia) is a Russian-Czech contemporary artist, painter, graphic artist and illustrator. Since 1998 he has been living and working in Prague, Czech Republic.

Biography
 

Russian-Czech painter and book illustrator, Ivanov, was born in 1966 in Tyumen, Siberia, Russia. Since 1998 he has lived and worked in Prague, Czech Republic. Ivanov's artworks are founded on dreams and of the unconscious. Ivanov's imagery is suffused with surrealistic poetry. Along with his oil paintings and watercolors, Eugene Ivanov has illustrated over 200 books. He has had numerous solo exhibitions and his works are collected internationally. In his art, the artist unites elements of the landscape realism, motifs of yards and back streets of the Prague´s Old Town, or the classical still-life with modern styles of the beginning of the 20th century - cubism, suprematism and expressionism.

Selected exhibitions
 2023. KLAPKA TOUR 2023. Hybernia Theatre, Prague, Czech Republic.
 2022. 25th anniversary of the Film flap salon. Hybernia Theatre, Prague, Czech Republic.
 2018. Solo Exhibition. Zojak gallery, Prague, Czech Republic.
 2017. Francysk Skaryna and Prague, National Library of the Czech Republic, Clementinum, Prague, Czech Republic.
 2017. Solo Exhibition, Gallery by Jiri Konecny, Veseli nad Moravou, Czech Republic
 2013. Solo Exhibition, Krcek Gallery. Ostrozska Nova Ves, Czech Republic. 
 2010. Solo Exhibition, Russian Centre Of Science And Culture, Prague, Czech Republic. 
 2009. "At the Water’s Edge" Solo Exhibition by Eugene Ivanov, EE Fine Art, Cambridge, UK. 
 2009. EE Fine Art gallery, January Sale, "Keeping it Small", Cambridge, UK. 
 2009. Solo exhibition, ATRAX Gallery, Prerov, Czech Republic.
 2008. The Christmas exhibition (with Julius Cincar and Moarch Eveno), Ostrozska Nova Ves, Czech Republic.
 2005. The Christmas exhibition (with Moarch Eveno and Adolf Born), Ostrozska Nova Ves, Czech Republic.
 2003. Solo Exhibition, Russian Centre Of Science And Culture, Prague, Czech Republic.
 2002. Solo Exhibition, "Spolek Mlejn", Ostrava, Czech Republic.
 1993. Group Exhibition 1/2 (with Sergey Shapoval). ONMO Kultura Gallery, Tyumen, Russia.
 1991. Group exhibition. Exhibition hall of the association of painters (Tyumen artists union), Tyumen, Russia.
 1991. Solo exhibition No.9, Most Gallery, Palace of culture of oil workers, Tyumen, Russia.

Awards 
 2007. The winner of the competition. 2nd Annual International String Art Competition. United States.
 2006. The winner of the competition. 1st Annual International String Art Competition. United States. 
 2001. The winner of the competition. Contest of the Illustrations for poems. Belgian publishing house "Wallonie-Bruxelles". Prague, Czech Republic.

Book Illustrations by Eugene Ivanov
 2021. K.A. Griffin "The Accidental World" (Independently published, 2021). .
 2020. M. A. Lukatsky "Pedagogy in search of itself" (Maska, 2020). .
 2019. Bohumil Hrabal "Pábitelé / Palaverers" (Městská knihovna v Praze, 2019). .
 2019. Franta Sauer "Franta Habán ze Žižkova. Obrázky z doby popřevratové" (Městská knihovna v Praze, 2019). .
 2019. Fyodor Dostoevsky "Povídky / Stories" (Městská knihovna v Praze, 2019). .
 2019. Mikhail Bulgakov "Divadelní román / Theatrical Novel" (Městská knihovna v Praze, 2019). .
 2019. Ahmet Avcı "Kirli Rüyalar Şehri / City Of Dirty Dreams" (Dorlion Yayınları, 2019). .
 2019. Jiri Wilson Nemec "Kind stories". (Komfi, 2019).
 2018. Franta Sauer "Pašeráci" (Městská knihovna v Praze, 2018). .
 2018. Lewan Berdsenischwili "Heiliges Dunkel". (Mitteldeutscher Verlag, 2018). .
 2018. Christine Sterkens "Daar is het circus!". (Nik-nak, 2018). .
 2018. O. Henry "The Four Million". (T8Rugram, 2018). .
 2018. Franz Kafka "Das Schloss". (T8Rugram, 2018). .
 2018. Emile Zola "Au Bonheur Des Dames". (T8Rugram, 2018). .
 2018. Miguel de Cervantes "El ingenioso hidalgo Don Quijote de la Mancha". (T8Rugram, 2018). .
 2018. Alfred de Musset "La confession d'un enfant du siecle". (T8Rugram, 2018). .
 2017. Franz Kafka "Das Urteil und Die Verwandlung". (T8Rugram, 2017). .
 2017. William Shakespeare "Othello". (T8Rugram, 2017). .
 2017. Edgar Allan Poe "Eureka&The Unparalleled Adventure of One Hans Pfaall". (T8Rugram, 2017). .
 2017. Joseph Conrad "A Set of Six". (T8Rugram, 2017). .
 2017. Ilf I., Petrov E. "Bright personality". (T8Rugram, 2017). .
 2017. Ilf I., Petrov E. "Strong sense". (T8Rugram, 2017). .
 2017. Robert Louis Stevenson "Strange Case of Dr. Jekyll and Mr. Hyde". (T8Rugram, 2017). .
 2017. Arkady Averchenko "Humor for fools". (T8Rugram, 2017). .
 2017. Avraham Bar-Av "Moroccan Pushkin". (Hakibbutz Hameuchad, 2017).
 2017. Antoine de Saint-Exupery "The Wisdom of the Sands". (Dedalus Kitap, 2017). .
 2017. Otakar Hromadko "How the water was tempered". (Epocha, 2017). .
 2017. Jolanta Darczewska, Piotr Żochowski "ACTIVE MEASURES. Russia’s key export". (OSW, 2017). .
 2017. Sedat Bayraklı, Davut Bayraklı "The Book Of Curiosities". (Gençokur, 2017). .
 2017. Bülent Şenocak "Kan İftirası / Blood libel". (Dedalus Kitap, 2017). .
 2017. Mikhail Bulgakov "Black Snow". (Garamond, 2017). .
 2017. Antoine de Saint-Exupery "Kale / The Wisdom of the Sands". (Dedalus Kitap, 2017). .
 2017. Nikolai Gogol "Bir Delinin Hatıra Defteri / Diary of a Madman". (Panama Yayıncılık, 2017). .
 2017. Güray Süngü "İnsanın Acayip Kısa Tarihi / A Brief History of Odd People". (Dedalus Kitap, 2017). .
 2017. Andrey Filimonov "Tadpole and the Saints". (Ripol Classic, 2017). .
 2017. Boryszewski Apoloniusz Aleksander "Człowiek Wyprostowany / Upright Man". (Sowello, 2017). .
 2017. Zofia Mikuła "Don't chase me Alafufu". (Mamiko, 2017). .
 2017. Conjunctions:68 "Inside Out: Architectures of Experience" (Bard College, 2017). .
 2017. Irena Glotova "Kludgelogy". (Ridero, 2017). .
 2017. S. An-sky "Pioneers The First Breach ". (Syracuse University Press, 2017). .
 2017. Johann Wolfgang Goethe "Faust". (T8Rugram, 2017). .
 2017. Dmitry Merezhkovsky "The Kingdom of Antichrist". (T8Rugram, 2017). .
 2017. Tomasz Drabas, Denny Lee "Learning PySpark". (Acorn, 2017). .
 2017. Julian Hillebrand, Maximilian H. Nierhof "Mastering RStudio". (Acorn, 2017). .
 2017. Domenico Vecchioni "20 destini straordinari del XX secolo". (Greco e Greco, 2017). .
 2017. 吕旺·奥吉安 "伦理学反教材". (南海出版公司, 2017). .
 2017. Ben Pastor "Lumen". (Audible Studios, 2017). .
 2017. Ben Pastor "Kaputt Mundi". (Audible Studios, 2017). .
 2017. Ben Pastor "Luna bugiarda". (Audible Studios, 2017). .
 2017. Ben Pastor "Il signore delle cento ossa". (Audible Studios, 2017). .
 2017. D.K.R. Boyd "The Reflecting Man #3". (Wonderdog Press, 2017). .
 2017. Peter M Eronson "Bland skägg och släthyade". (Stevali, 2017). .
 2017. Mihaela Perciun "Cenușă rece". (Polirom, 2017). .
 2017. Γιάννης Μύρτσης "Εντός μου". (Εκδόσεις Πνοή, 2017). .
 2017. John R. Thelin "American Higher Education". (Routledge, 2017). .
 2017. Donato Caputo "Dimensione vita". (CSA Editrice, 2017). .
 2016. Hu Xiong, Zhen Qin "Introduction to Certificateless Cryptography". (CRC Press, 2016). .
 2016. David Hopkins "Dada and Surrealism". (Hindawi, 2016)
 2016. Diana Catt, Brenda Robertson Stewart "Fine Art of Murder". (Blue River Press, 2016). .
 2016. Gary Johns, Alan M. Saks "Organizational Behaviour". (Pearson Canada, 2016). .
 2016. Peter M Eronson "För att inte tala om döden". (Stevali, 2016). .
 2016. Son Cengiz Aydın "Fakat İyi Aldandık". (Olimpos, 2017). .
 2016. Henri Bergson "Etik ve Politika Dersleri". (Pinhan Yayıncılık, 2016). .
 2016. Alistair Cole, Renaud Payre "Cities as Political Objects". (Edward Elgar Publishing, 2016). .
 2016. Durali Yılmaz "Donuklar". (Yediveren Yayınları, 2016). .
 2016. Megan Rohrer "Never Again". (Lulu.com, 2016). .
 2016. Stefan Zweig "Frica. Scrisoare de la o necunoscută". (Polirom, 2016). .
 2016. Anna Maria Sdraffa "L' Agamennone". (0111edizioni, 2016). .
 2016. Gordon Bridger "The Message of Obadiah, Nahum and Zephaniah". (校園書房, 2016). .
 2016. Gustave Flaubert "LBouvard und Pécuchet". (Kindle Edition, 2016). .
 2016. Leopoldo Gasbarro "Un violino per papa Francesco". (Paoline Editoriale Libri, 2016). , .
 2016. Francis Scott Fitzgerald "The Curious Case of Benjamin Button". (CreateSpace, 2016). .
 2016. Peter Cowlam "New King Palmers". (CentreHouse Press, 2016). .
 2016. Manfred Steinbach "Neues vom Sender Eriwan". (Vopelius Jena, 2016). .
 2016. Luigi Gussago "Picaresque Fiction Today". (Lam edition, 2016). .
 2016. Elena Kasyan "Fragile". (Ahill, 2016). .
 2015. Maroussia Klimova "Trampled the flowers of evil". (Ast, 2015). .
 2015. Marianna Goncharova "Etudes for the left hand". (Azbuka, 2015). .
 2015. Marianna Goncharova "Unlicensed bus and other funny stories". (Azbuka, 2015). .
 2015. Yury Buida "The Prussian Bride". (Eksmo, 2015). .
 2015. Franz Kafka "The Castle". (Ast, 2015). .
 2015. Toygar Barut "Madanayuyu". (Destek Yayinlari, 2015). .
 2015. Victor Hugo "Sefiller / Les Miserables". (Panama Yayıncılık, 2015). .
 2015. Yury Buida "Woman in Yellow". (Eksmo, 2015). .
 2015. Nina Sadur "The Marvellous Old Woman". (Ast, 2015). .
 2015. Edvard Radzinsky "But does love exist?" – ask the firemen". (Ast, 2014). .
 2015. Gustav Meyrink "Golem". (Eksmo, 2015). .
 2015. Robert Louis Stevenson "The Suicide Club". (Garamond, 2015). .
 2015. Hakan Şenocak "Karanfilsiz". (Dedalus Kitap, 2015). .
 2015. Spiro György "1956 ve Küçük Adam / The little man in 1956". (Dedalus Kitap, 2015). .
 2015. Greenstone Lobo "What is Your True Zodiac Sign?". (Celestial Books, 2015). .
 2015. Stephanie McKendry "Critical Thinking Skills for Healthcare". (Routledge, 2015). .
 2015. Alberto Manguel "A Reading Diary". (Dar al Saqi, 2015). .
 2015. Ömer Naci Soykan "Estetik ve Sanat Felsefesi". (Pinhan Yayıncılık, 2015). .
 2015. Henri Bergson "Metafizik Dersleri". (Pinhan Yayıncılık, 2015). .
 2015. Ioan Stanomir "Sfinxul rus". (Adenium, 2015). .
 2015. Yusef Komunyakaa "Neon Vernacular". (Valparaíso Ediciones, 2015). .
 2015. 오카다 다카시 "나는 왜 혼자가 편할까?". (동양북스, 2015). .
 2015. D.K.R. Boyd "The Reflecting Man #2". (Wonderdog Press, 2015). .
 2015. David Grossman "Un cal intra intr-un bar". (Polirom, 2015). .
 2015. Sarah Porter "To Mooc or Not to Mooc". (Chandos Publishing, 2015). .
 2014. Roberto Arlt "Cei 7 nebuni". (Strada Fictiunii, 2014). .
 2014. Andrew Nicoll "A fost odată ca niciodată/The good mayor". (Strada Fictiunii, 2014). .
 2014. Matei Brunul "Lucian Dan Teodorovici". (Polirom, 2014). .
 2014. Yohanan Petrovsky-Shtern "Sztetl". (Wydawnictwa Uniwersytetu Jagiellońskiego, 2014). .
 2014. Luigi Pirandello "Mondo di carta e altre novelle". (Faligi Editore, 2014). .
 2014. Johann Wolfgang Goethe "La vocazione teatrale di Wilhelm Meister". (Faligi Editore, 2014). .
 2014. Fyodor Dostoevsky "Povera Gente". (Faligi Editore, 2014). .
 2014. Jules Renard "Storie naturali 1". (Faligi Editore, 2014). .
 2014. Jules Renard "Storie naturali 2". (Faligi Editore, 2014). .
 2014. Ioan Slavici "Fiabe". (Faligi Editore, 2014). .
 2014. Luigi Pirandello "Il buon cuore e altre novelle". (Faligi Editore, 2014). .
 2014. Alexandros Papadiamantis "Jito Jabbo". (Faligi Editore, 2014). .
 2014. Franz Grillparzer "Il Povero musicante". (Faligi Editore, 2014). .
 2014. Franz Grillparzer "Il convento di Sendomir". (Faligi Editore, 2014). .
 2014. Charles Dickens "Il Lampinario". (Faligi Editore, 2014). .
 2014. Jose Azorin "Le confessioni di un piccolo filosofo". (Faligi Editore, 2014). .
 2014. Luigi Pirandello "In silenzio". (Faligi Editore, 2014). .
 2014. Charles Dickens "Le Campane". (Faligi Editore, 2014). .
 2014. Jack London "Il vagabondo delle stelle". (Faligi Editore, 2014). .
 2014. Katherine Mansfield "In una pensione tedesca". (Faligi Editore, 2014). .
 2014. Maria-Anna Brucker "Klezmer". (Schell Music, 2014). .
 2014. Emilia Pardo Bazan "La Tribuna". (Faligi Editore, 2014). .
 2014. Christy Bower "Bible Surveyor Handbook". (CreateSpace, 2014). .
 2014. Vivien Miller, James Campbell "Transnational Penal Cultures". (Routledge, 2014). .
 2014. Blanka Grzegorczyk "Discourses of Postcolonialism in Contemporary British Children's Literature". (Routledge, 2014). .
 2014. Paul J. Nahin "Holy Sci-Fi!". (Springer, 2014). .
 2014. Serkan Türk "Bak Önümüzde Yeni Bir Mevsim / Look, the new season before us". (Dedalus Kitap, 2014). .
 2014. Emre Ergin "Dördüncü Dilek: La Disparition / The Fourth Wish: The Disappearance". (Dedalus Kitap, 2014). .
 2014. Güray Süngü "Köşe Başında Suret Bulan Tek Kişilik Aşk / Around The Corner Found A Single Surrogate Love". (Dedalus Kitap, 2014). .
 2014. Jiri Wilson Nemec "Rychlebsko's tales 2". (Komfi, 2014). .
 2014. Ivan Zorin "The Clown's avatar". (Ripol klassik, 2014). .
 2014. Marianna Goncharova "Cat Scriabin". (Azbuka, 2014). .
 2014. Harry Gordon "Later. Dark. Far." (Ast, 2014). .
 2014. Andrey Ivanov "Bizar". (Ripol klassik, 2014). .
 2014. Leonid Filatov "Sons of Bitches". (Ast, 2014). .
 2014. Edvard Radzinsky "I stand at restaurant: in marriage - late to die - early". (Ast, 2014). .
 2014. Maroussia Klimova "My Anti-History of Russian Literature". (Ast, 2014). .
 2014. Drago Jancar "Kehanet". (Dedalus, 2014). , .
 2014. Yury Buida "Blue blood". (Eksmo, 2014). .
 2014. Marianna Goncharova "Kangaroo in the jacket and other funny stories". (Azbuka, 2014). , .
 2014. Yury Buida "Message for My Lady Left Hand". (Eksmo, 2014). .
 2014. Pedro Barrento "Marlene and Sofia". (CreateSpace Independent Publishing Platform, 2014). , . 
 2014. Yury Dombrovsky "The Keeper of Antiquities". (Strada Fictiunii, 2014). .
 2013. Fyodor Dostoyevsky Crime and punishment. (Panama Yayıncılık, 2013). .
 2013. Leo Rosten "The Joys of Yiddish". (Leda, 2013). . 
 2013. Yury Buida "Poison and honey". (Eksmo, 2013). . 
 2013. Vsevolod Benigsen "Frolov Chakra". (Eksmo, 2013). . 
 2013. Yury Buida "Ermo". (Eksmo, 2013). . 
 2013. Yury Buida "Lions and lilies". (Eksmo, 2013). . 
 2013. Elena Kasyan "Sent dot". (Ahill, 2013). . 
 2013. Yury Buida "Zhungli". (Eksmo, 2013). . 
 2013. Jean-François Beauchemin "The Day Crows".  (Québec Amérique, 2013). .
 2013. Orhan Tez "Söyleş Benimle Dedi Güzel Türkçem". (Cinius, 2013). . 
 2013. Ron Miller "The Radical Theories of Copernicus, Kepler, Galileo, and Newton". (Twenty-First Century Books, 2013). . 
 2013. Yury Buida "Don Domino". (Eksmo, 2013). . 
 2013. Marianna Goncharova "The Fourth Ring". (Azbuka, 2013). . 
 2013. Angela Shteyngart "Don't get used to love". (M. Graphics Publishing, 2013). . 
 2013. Yury Buida "Thief, spy and murderer". (Eksmo, 2013). . 
 2013. Rabbi Nachman`s Haggadah. (Miskal-Yedioth Ahronoth Books and Chemed Books, 2013). . 
 2013. Master Eugene "English listening training diary". (Person, 2013). . 
 2013. Aluisio Azevedo "O Homem". (Martin Claret, 2013). .
 2013. Vilma de Sousa "Língua e Literatura em Foco 1.". (Positivo, 2013). .
 2013. Vilma de Sousa "Língua e Literatura em Foco 2". (Positivo, 2013). .
 2013. Vilma de Sousa "Língua e Literatura em Foco 3". (Positivo, 2013). .
 2013. D.K.R. Boyd "The Reflecting Man #1". (Wonderdog Press, 2013). .
 2013. José Martí "Amicizia funesta". (Faligi Editore, 2013). .
 2013. Mikhail Bulgakov "La guardia bianca". (Faligi Editore, 2013). .
 2013. Oscar Wilde "Il ritratto di Mr. W.H.". (Faligi Editore, 2013). .
 2013. Arya Yudistira Syuman "Metafora dalam Cinta". (PT Gramedia Pustaka Utam, 2013). .
 2013. Gotthold Ephraim Lessing "Favole e racconti". (Faligi Editore, 2013). .
 2012. Thomas W. Collier "History of Jazz Online Course". (Kendall Hunt Publishing Company, 2012). .
 2012. Sergio de Regules "La mamá de Kepler". (B DE BOOKS, 2012). .
 2012. P. G. Wodehouse "A little bit of someone else's feelings". (Аst, 2012). .
 2012. M. Zattoni, G. Gillini "I racconti meravigliosi della Bibbia". (Effatà, 2012). . 
 2012. Aluisio Azevedo "O Cortico". (Martin Claret, 2012). . 
 2012. P. G. Wodehouse "The Clicking of Cuthber. The Heart of a Goof. Lord Emsworth and Others". (Astrel, 2012). . 
 2012. Yury Dombrovsky "The Faculty of Useless Knowledge". (Strada Fictiunii, 2012). . 
 2012. Yury Dombrovsky "The Monkey Comes for his Skull". (Strada Fictiunii, 2012). . 
 2012. Débora Cristina Santos e Silva, Goiandira Ortiz de Camargo "Look The Poem". (Cânone Editorial, 2012). . 
 2012. Jean-Philippe Calvin "Kleztet". (Emerson Edition, 2012). ISMN M570407620. 
 2012. Tudor Călin Zarojanu "Mass Media Insider". (Editura Polirom, 2012). . 
 2012. Stratis Tsirkas "Jerusalem". (Can Yayınları, 2012). . 
 2012. Daniel Lifschitz "The rabbis, hustlers and beggars". (Wydawnictwo Promic, 2012). .
 2012. John Oldale "Doktor Oldales geographisches Lexikon". (Rororo, 2012). , . 
 2012. Daniel Lifschitz "Laughter in Hebrew from A to Z". (Wydawnictwo Promic, 2012). . 
 2012. Hayden Thorne "Clouds’ Illusions". (JMS Books LLC, 2012). . 
 2012. Diane-Gabrielle Tremblay Articuler emploi et famille. (Presses de l'Université du Québec, 2012). .
 2012. P. G. Wodehouse Something Fresh. Summer Lightning. Heavy Weather. Uncle Fred in the Springtime. (Astrel, 2012). . 
 2012. P. G. Wodehouse Full Moon. Uncle Dynamite. Pics Have Wings. Coctail Time. Blandings Castle. (Astrel, 2012). . 
 2012. John Fletcher, Ben Jonson English Comedy Plays of the Seventeenth and Eighteenth Century. (Kindle Edition, 2012). ASIN B008PGQ172. 
 2012. P. G. Wodehouse The Little Nugget: Piccadilly Jim: Money for Nothing. (Astrel, 2012). . 
 2012. M. Lavrentyev Visions of the earth. (Literaturnaya Rossiya, 2012). .
 2011. European integration. Edited by O. Butorina. (Business literature, 2011). . 
 2011. Mohammed Hasan Alwan "The Beaver". (Saqi Books, Beirut, 2011). . 
 2011. David Allen The Sophisticated Alcoholic. (John Hunt, 2011). .
 2011. The book by Rabbi Adin Steinsaltz Six stories of Rabbi Nachman of Bratzlav. (Devir, 2011). 
 2011. P. G. Wodehouse Ukride and other story. (Astrel, 2011). . 
 2011. Zdenek K. Slaby "Scary tales". (Portal, 2011). . 
 2011. Cori Pursell "The Night Pilgrimage". (Lulu, 2011). . 
 2011. Izumi Utamaro "One day I died". (Yedam, 2011). . 
 2011. James Joyce "A portrait of the artist as a young man". (Feel the book, 2011).
 2011. Leo Tolstoy "Insan Ne ile Yasar / What Men Live By". (Panama Yayıncılık, 2011). . 
 2011. Igor Guberman "All "Gariks". (Zakharov Books, 2011). .
 2011. Léo Dex, M. Dibos "Viaggio e avventure di un aerostato attraverso il Madagascar insorto". (Faligi Editore, 2011). .
 2011. Brian M. Stableford "The Quintessence of August". (Borgo Press, 2011). .
 2011. Joel Chandler Harris "Il piccolo Sig.Dito De Ditale e il suo stravagante paese". (Faligi Editore, 2011). .
 2011. Elettra Groppo "Al di là del fiume". (Faligi Editore, 2011). .
 2011. Cyrus Townsend Brady "Un piccolo libro per il Natale". (Faligi Editore, 2011). .
 2010. Giorgio Borra "La stanza del tenente". (0111edizioni, 2010). .
 2010. DC Erickson. No One Laughs at a Dead Clown. (CreateSpace Independent Publishing Platform, 2010). , .
 2010. Randall Garrett "Despoilers of the Golden Empire". (Wildside Press, 2010). , .
 2010. Arthur Phillips "Prague". (Modern Times S.A., Athens, 2010). . 
 2010. Huseyin Tunc "Now what are we actually". (Nesil, 2010). 
 2010. Vladimir Dobrushkin "Mathematics of Social Choice and Finance". (Kendall Hunt, 2010). . 
 2010. Sendecka Zyta, Szedzianis Elzbieta "The Books seria Vademecum of High school examination". (Operon, 2010).  
 2010. Autori Vari "Bookland 2010". (MyBook, 2010). . 
 2010. W. Somerset Maugham "The Hero". (WLC, 2010). . 
 2010. The book series by P. G. Wodehouse. (Astrel, 2012). 
 2010. The poetry book "Poetica Magazine". (Poetica, 2010). . 
 2010. Ed Galing "Pushcarts and Peddlers". (Poetica, 2010). 
 2010. Lyubov and Yevgeny Lukins "Until the Time Ends". (PrinTerra-Dizajn, 2010). . 
 2010. Elena Kasjan "Poste Restante". (Ahill, 2010). .
 2009. Dorothy L. Sayers "Whose Body?". (Wildside Press, 2009). .
 2009. Horatio Alger "Struggling Upward". (Wildside Press, 2009). .
 2009. Gotthold Ephraim Lessing "Nathan the Wise: A Dramatic Play in Five Acts". (Classic Drama Book Company, 2009). , . 
 2009. Agatha Christie "Einzige ungekürzte lesung". (Hörbuchproduktionen, 2009). . 
 2009. Jiri Kratochvil "The immortal story". (Mozaik knjiga, 2009). .
 2009. Rabbi Dov Peretz Elkins "Jewish Guided Imagery". (A.R.E. Press, 2009). . 
 2008. Yevgenia Ginzburg "Journey into the Whirlwind". (Astrel, 2008). ., .
 2008. Elisabeth Kübler-Ross "The wheell of life: A memoir of living and dying ". (BM Books, Golden Owl, 2008). .
 2007. Daniele D'Alberto "Pensieri di Scribacchino". (Caravaggio Editore, 2007). . 
 2004. The children book "Murbi ja Paliina". (Hea Algus, 2004). . 
 2000. The children colouring book. (Pierot, 2000).

Selected music album covers by Eugene Ivanov

Selected book covers by Eugene Ivanov

Notes

External links

Big Eugene Ivanov's art collection on Patreon
Eugene Ivanov on Etsy
Eugene Ivanov on Dreamstime
Eugene Ivanov on pinterest
Eugene Ivanov on facebook
So Real in So Many Ways: Surreal Illustrations Eugene Ivanov.
Eugene Ivanov on Radio Prague interview Live
I work everyday. It’s an unconscious, intuitive process.
Illustrations of Mafusail's lamp or the most recent battle of chekists with masons / Russian: Лампа Мафусаила, или Крайняя битва чекистов с масонами
Discover the Surreal Artwork of Illustrator Eugene Ivanov
Illustrations of Buddha's Little Finger (Chapayev and Void) / Russian: Чапаев и Пустота
Eugene Ivanov in the Databases of the National Library of Czech Republic
Artbrokerage.com/Eugene-Ivanov 

1966 births
Living people
Czech painters
Czech male painters
Russian painters
Russian male painters
Artists from Prague
Steampunk
Cubist artists
Modern artists
People from Tyumen